The Iglesia de San Juan Bautista in Maricao, Puerto Rico is a church built during 1890-c.1898.  It was listed on the National Register of Historic Places in 1984.

Its facade, facing onto the plaza of Maricao, is dominated by a three-level square bell tower, whose first level is a portico and which is capped by a pyramidal concrete roof.  Its exterior has Gothic-style pointed arches;  its interior has more traditional rounded arches.  It has a nave and two aisles.  The church's original roof was replaced in 1965 by a metal joist structure supporting corrugated asbestos sheets.

It was designed by engineer Jeronimo Jiminez Coranado.

It is one of 31 churches reviewed for listing on the National Register in 1984.

References

Churches on the National Register of Historic Places in Puerto Rico
Roman Catholic churches completed in 1898
19th-century Roman Catholic church buildings in the United States
Gothic Revival church buildings in Puerto Rico
1898 establishments in Puerto Rico
Maricao, Puerto Rico